Mafikizolo is a South African Afro-pop music duo formed in 1996, consisting of composer Theo Kgosinkwe and lead singer Nhlanhla Nciza. The duo rose to fame after they released their singles "Ndihamba Nawe kuphela", "Kwela Kwela", "Sibongile", "Udakwa Njalo" .
The group released their self-titled album Mafikizolo in 1997 and Music Revolution in 1999.

In 2000, the band released their third album Gate Crashers, which became the best-selling album.

Mafikizolo has won 14 South African Music Award, 2 MTV Africa Music Awards including the awards for Best Duo or Group of the Year.

History

1997-2002: Mafikizolo, Music Revolution and Sibongile
They came into the scene in 1997 as a kwaito group with their late member Tebogo Madingoane, who died on 14 February 2004, when they released their self-titled album Mafikizolo. They released their 1999 album titled Music Revolution followed by Gate Crushers in 2000 which included their hits, "Lotto" and "Majika".

After a near-fatal crash that left Nhlanhla Nciza hospitalised for a while, they released their critically acclaimed album Sibongile (2002) featuring the hit single "Ndihamba Nawe".

2003-2010: Kwela, Van Toeka Af and Six Mabone
In 2003, they released Kwela which featured Hugh Masekela assisted "Kwela Kwela", "Udakwa Njalo" and "Emlanjeni" amongst others.

In 2005, they released Van Toeka Af which featured Nisixoshelani and Mas'Thokoze amongst others. In 2006, they released Six Mabone which featured "O Tswa Kae" and "Love Potion". Six Mabone was released before their hiatus.

During their hiatus in 2009 they released a compilation album The Best of which included one new song, "Walila".

2011-2018: Reunited and 20
They resumed work as a group in 2013 when they released their internationally acclaimed single "Khona" featuring Uhuru. In 2014, "Khona" single  was performed live at MTV Africa Music Awards during the ceremony.

Their first album after their hiatus followed in 2013 and was titled Reunited which saw them winning  awards at 20th South Africa Music Awards  in one night amongst other awards. To promote Reunited they embarked on UK Tour, performed in three cities  London, Manchester and Coventry. Mafikizolo was nominated for Best African Act at MTV Europe Music Awards in 2013.  The success of Reunited was so great that they released a follow-up album four years later in 2017 titled 20 to celebrate their 20th anniversary in the music industry. The album features "Love Potion" and the Yemi Alade-assisted "Ofana Nawe".

At 24th South African Music Awards,  20 received three nominations and won Duo/Group of the Year and Best Engineered album category.

2019-present: Idwala 
After three years they announced their upcoming album which was set to be released in 2022.

In November 2021, their single "Mamezala" featuring South African singer Simmy was released. The song peaked number 9 on  Radio Monitor Charts.

"10k" featuring South African singer Sjava was released on June 10, 2022.

Their twelfth studio album Idwala was released on  August 26, 2022.

Band members 
 Nhlanhla Nciza - lead vocals (1996–Present)
Theo Kgosinkwe - (1996–present)
 Tebogo Benedict Madingoane -  (1996-2004)

Discography

Studio albums 
 Mafikizolo (1997)
 Music Revolution (1999)
 Gate Crashers (2000)
 Sibongile (2002)
 Kwela (2003)
 Van Toeka Af (2005)
 Six Mabone (2006)
 Reunited (2013)
 20 (2017)
 Idwala (2022)

Awards and nominations

References

External links

South African musical duos